Mickey Kwiatkowski (born August 31, 1947) is an American football coach and a proponent of the Spread-T flex offense. Kwiatkowski served as offensive coordinator at Southwest Missouri State University before becoming head coach at Hofstra University, then a member of the NCAA's Division III. In 1990, he was hired by Brown University but was fired after a four-year record of 7–33.

Head coaching record

References

1947 births
Living people
Boston College Eagles football coaches
Brown Bears football coaches
Delaware Fightin' Blue Hens football players
Hofstra Pride football coaches
Missouri State Bears football coaches
Salisbury Sea Gulls football coaches
West Chester Golden Rams football coaches
American people of Polish descent